William Reid (born 18 July 1963) is a Scottish professional football coach and former player who is the assistant manager to Graham Potter at Chelsea of the Premier League.

Reid played for Queen of the South, Clyde, Hamilton Academical and Stirling Albion during the 1980s and 1990s. After a spell as caretaker manager of Clyde in 2002, he was appointed manager in 2004. After one season as Clyde manager, Reid was appointed manager of Hamilton. The club won promotion to the Scottish Premier League in 2008, when Reid also won the PFA Scotland Manager of the Year award. Despite being relegated in 2011, Reid continued as Hamilton manager until April 2013. In November 2013, he moved to Swedish club Östersund as an assistant coach.

Playing career
In his playing days Reid started off at Dumfries club, Queen of the South where he was signed by Nobby Clark. Reid was later remembered by teammate Tommy Bryce as one of the best players at the club. The three were part of Queen's 1985–86 Scottish Second Division promotion success. It was at Queens where Reid gave his longest service as a player.

Reid then played for Clyde and Hamilton Academical before finishing his career with Stirling Albion. He worked as a printer while playing part-time.

Coaching career

Clyde
Reid began his managerial career in 2002 with a caretaker appointment at a club he had played for, Scottish First Division club Clyde. This was in between the departure of Allan Maitland and the appointment of Alan Kernaghan. He took over the Bully Wee on a permanent basis in July 2004 following Kernaghan's two-year spell in charge. Reid took the club to third place in the 2004–05 Scottish First Division in his only season in charge.

Hamilton Academical
Reid then became manager at a club competing in the same division as Clyde and another which he had previously served as a player, Hamilton Academical, taking over from Allan Maitland, also a former Clyde boss. Working under owner Ronnie MacDonald, he took the Accies to the 2007–08 Scottish First Division title earning promotion to the Scottish Premier League. He won that season's PFA Scotland Manager of the Year award.

After leading Hamilton to an impressive seventh-place finish in the Scottish Premier League in 2009–10, Reid was linked with a move to a number of clubs including Swansea City, but rejected their approach claiming to have unfinished business with Hamilton. Hamilton were relegated from the top flight in 2011. Reid left Hamilton by mutual consent on 3 April 2013, after more than seven years in the job.

Östersund
Despite being linked to the manager's job at Morton, Reid became assistant manager at Östersund in November 2013 to Graham Potter. At the end of his second year in Sweden Östersund were runners-up in the 2015 Superettan earning promotion to the top flight. In 2017 they finished fifth in the league and won the 2016–17 Svenska Cupen. This earned a place in the 2nd qualification round of the 2017–18 UEFA Europa League in which they eliminated Galatasaray. They also eliminated PAOK before finishing second in the group behind Athletic Bilbao eliminating Zorya Luhansk and Hertha BSC. They were knocked out in the next round by Arsène Wenger's Arsenal 4–2 on aggregate.

Swansea City
Reid was appointed assistant manager at Swansea City on 11 June 2018, again working with Graham Potter. Swansea finished in 10th place in their first season back in the Championship after relegation from the Premier League. The Swans made the quarter final of the FA Cup controversially losing to Manchester City.

Brighton & Hove Albion
Potter was appointed as the new Brighton & Hove Albion manager on 20 May 2019 where Reid, coach Bjorn Hamberg and head of recruitment Kyle Macaulay moved to the Sussex club alongside Potter. Reid was set to take charge of Brighton's away fixture at Leicester City on 23 January 2022, due to Potter testing positive for Covid–19. However, Reid himself later tested positive meaning first team coach Björn Hamberg had to take charge of the 1–1 draw.

Chelsea 
In September 2022, Reid moved to Chelsea from Brighton as Potter's assistant coach, along with attacking coach Bruno Saltor Grau, defensive coach Bjorn Hamberg, and goalkeeping coach Ben Roberts.

Personal life
His son, Billy Jnr, was also a footballer, who played for Clyde.

Managerial statistics

Honours

Player
Queen of the South
 1985–86 Scottish Second Division promotion

Manager
Hamilton Academical
 2007–08 Scottish First Division champions
 2007–08 PFA Scotland Manager of the Year

Assistant manager
Östersund
2015 Superettan promotion
2016–17 Svenska Cupen winners

References

External links

Clyde managerial statistics at Fitbastats
Hamilton managerial statistics at Fitbastats

1963 births
Living people
Footballers from Glasgow
Scottish footballers
Association football defenders
Association football midfielders
Association football utility players
People educated at Bishopbriggs High School
Ashfield F.C. players
Petershill F.C. players
Queen of the South F.C. players
Clyde F.C. players
Hamilton Academical F.C. players
Stirling Albion F.C. players
Scottish Football League players
Scottish Junior Football Association players
Scottish football managers
Clyde F.C. non-playing staff
Clyde F.C. managers
Hamilton Academical F.C. managers
Swansea City A.F.C. non-playing staff
Brighton & Hove Albion F.C. non-playing staff
Scottish Football League managers
Scottish Premier League managers
Scottish expatriate sportspeople in Sweden
Chelsea F.C. non-playing staff